Asmat may mean:
Asmat people
Asmat languages
Asmat Regency, Indonesia
Asmat Subregion, in northwestern Eritrea